Preignac is a commune in the Gironde department in Nouvelle-Aquitaine in southwestern France.

Preignac is located in the Sauternes wine appellation of Bordeaux. Preignac station has rail connections to Langon and Bordeaux.

Population

See also
Communes of the Gironde department

References

Communes of Gironde